Brian Joseph Booth (3 December 1935 – 14 December 2020) was an English cricketer who played in 350 first-class matches and 64 List A games, nearly all of them for Lancashire and Leicestershire, in a career that stretched between 1956 and 1973. He was born in Billinge End, Blackburn, Lancashire.

Booth was a right-handed batsman sometimes used as an opener and a right-arm legbreak and googly bowler. He passed 1000 runs in eight seasons during his career, and scored more than 800 first-class runs in three other seasons. In his early career with Lancashire between 1956 and 1963, he bowled regularly, taking up to 30 wickets in a season, but after he joined Leicestershire in 1964 he was no more than an occasional bowler, and did not take more than nine wickets in any one season.

Booth's highest first-class score was 183 not out for Lancashire against Oxford University in 1961. His best bowling figures were 7 for 143 for Lancashire against Worcestershire in 1959.

Booth died aged 85 in December 2020.

References

1935 births
2020 deaths
Cricketers from Blackburn
English cricketers
Lancashire cricketers
Leicestershire cricketers
North v South cricketers